Tiago José Ribeiro Costa (born 22 April 1985) is a Portuguese professional footballer who plays for União Atlético Povoense as a right back.

Club career
Born in Lisbon, Costa started his football career with hometown's S.L. Benfica, but only appeared officially for the reserves. In the summer of 2006, he signed for Scottish club Heart of Midlothian, making his Scottish Premier League debut against Inverness Caledonian Thistle on 28 August. However, he failed to feature again for the team and was released on 13 November. Again in his homeland he represented Vitória de Setúbal, but again only competed with the B side.

In June 2007, Costa moved clubs and countries again, joining Bulgaria's FC Vihren Sandanski. He appeared in less than one fourth of the games as his team finished in tenth position in the First Professional Football League, and returned to Portugal where he successively played for Varzim S.C. and F.C. Vizela, respectively in the second and third tiers. On 20 May 2011, while at the service of G.D. Estoril Praia, he was suspended for four months after failing a drug test on 28 December of the previous year, in a match against S.C. Freamunde.

Costa signed for FC Politehnica Timișoara in Romania in January 2010 on a five-month contract, being released on 4 June after failing to make a single competitive appearance and moving to G.D. Estoril Praia shortly after. He started 2011–12 in his country's Primeira Liga with Rio Ave FC, but returned to division two in the following transfer window, joining Leixões S.C. on loan.

References

External links

London Hearts profile

1985 births
Living people
Footballers from Lisbon
Portuguese footballers
Association football defenders
Primeira Liga players
Liga Portugal 2 players
Segunda Divisão players
S.L. Benfica B players
Varzim S.C. players
F.C. Vizela players
G.D. Estoril Praia players
Rio Ave F.C. players
Leixões S.C. players
Académico de Viseu F.C. players
C.D. Mafra players
Scottish Premier League players
Heart of Midlothian F.C. players
First Professional Football League (Bulgaria) players
OFC Vihren Sandanski players
FC Politehnica Timișoara players
Cypriot First Division players
Olympiakos Nicosia players
Doxa Katokopias FC players
Israeli Premier League players
Hapoel Tel Aviv F.C. players
Portugal youth international footballers
Portuguese expatriate footballers
Expatriate footballers in Scotland
Expatriate footballers in Bulgaria
Expatriate footballers in Romania
Expatriate footballers in Cyprus
Expatriate footballers in Israel
Portuguese expatriate sportspeople in Scotland
Portuguese expatriate sportspeople in Bulgaria
Portuguese expatriate sportspeople in Romania
Portuguese expatriate sportspeople in Cyprus
Portuguese expatriate sportspeople in Israel
Doping cases in association football
Portuguese sportspeople in doping cases